Harold Adrian Walden (10 October 1887 – 2 December 1955) was an English amateur footballer who played for several clubs, Halifax Town, Bradford City and Arsenal. Walden also played for Great Britain's football team, with which he won gold in the 1912 Summer Olympics.

Playing career
A centre forward, he began his career with Cliftonville and Linfield in Ireland, before joining Halifax Town in October 1911 and Bradford City two months later. He spent four seasons with the Bantams and was the League's top scorer in 1911–12. That summer, he was part of the English amateur team that represented Great Britain at the Olympic football tournament, playing a pivotal role in helping the team win the gold medal since he netted 9 goals in just three games, thus averaging three goals per game. Walden scored six goals in a 7–0 win over Schlosser's Hungary in the quarter-finals, followed by two goals in a 4–0 win over Finland in the semi-finals, and then netted a goal in the final against Denmark as Great Britain won 4–2, thus contributing decisively to his side's triumph in Stockholm. He holds the record of being the 'Highest British goal scorer within the Olympics' and is still the shared eighth highest goal scorer overall within the Olympics.

Walden entered the army by joining the Cheshire Regiment in April 1902 at the age of 14 and a half as a drummer boy and served in India and Ireland. He played for the Army against the Navy in 1910 and 1911, and also served in World War I, for the West Yorkshire Regiment, rising to the rank of captain. After the war ended he joined Arsenal and played six times for the Gunners, twice against Oldham Athletic scoring a single goal and in four friendlies, with his debut coming on 12 February 1921. With just those games to his name, he returned to Bradford at the end of the 1920–21 season.

Personal life
After retiring from football and the army, he went into the music hall as a variety performer, touring England, Australia, China and India. He made his stage debut while still playing football, in 1919. He had also had a minor film career, which included starring in The Winning Goal, one of the earliest football-related films, in 1920. Walden also played himself in the 1948 film Cup-tie Honeymoon. He made 78rpm records such as "Ronnie the Robin" together with "And only me knows why", on the Imperial label as well as from Ernest Binns' Arcadian Follies, 'Mother I'm a soldier' and 'Only me knows why' upon Parlophone. The latter was reviewed in The Gramophone magazine's November 1939 edition. He died in 1955 of a heart attack at Leeds railway station. He is buried at Killingbeck RC Cemetery, York Road, Leeds, Yorkshire.

International goals
England Amateurs score listed first, score column indicates score after each Walden goal.

Honours
Great Britain
Summer Olympics 1912: Gold Medal

Individual
Silver Boot: 1912 Summer Olympics

References

External links
 
 
 

1887 births
1955 deaths
English footballers
English Olympic medallists
England amateur international footballers
Footballers at the 1912 Summer Olympics
Olympic footballers of Great Britain
Olympic gold medallists for Great Britain
Halifax Town A.F.C. players
Bradford City A.F.C. players
Arsenal F.C. players
People from Ardwick
West Yorkshire Regiment officers
Cheshire Regiment officers
British Army personnel of World War I
Olympic medalists in football
Medalists at the 1912 Summer Olympics
Cliftonville F.C. players
Linfield F.C. players
NIFL Premiership players
Association football forwards